The Morris House  is an historic building located at 4001 Linnean Drive, Northwest, Washington, D.C., in the Forest Hills neighborhood, next to Rock Creek Park.

History
The Jacobethan style house was designed by Porter and Lockie in 1939, for Edgar and Beronica Morris.
It is owned by the Democratic Republic of the Congo.

It was designated a DC landmark on May 27, 2010.
It was assessed at $3,668,860, in 2010.

See also 
Rock Creek Park

References

External links
wikimapia
http://www.realtor.com/property-detail/4001-Linnean-Ave-NW_Washington_DC_20008_cfc21800

Houses on the National Register of Historic Places in Washington, D.C.
Houses completed in 1939